Chip Bailey (16 March 1921 – 1963) was a New Zealand communist, taxi driver and trade unionist. He was born in Blenheim, Nelson, New Zealand on 16 March 1921.

References

1921 births
1963 deaths
New Zealand trade unionists
New Zealand communists
New Zealand taxi drivers